Phosphatochelys ("phosphate turtle") is an extinct genus of bothremydid pleurodiran turtle that was discovered near Oued Zem, Morocco.  The genus consists solely of type species P. tedfordi.

 Discovery Phosphatochelys'' was discovered in the Oued Zem locality of Morocco, and is known from exclusively from a complete 6.8-centimetre-long skull, lacking the lower jaw. The holotype was given to one of the describers by a friend, who had purchased it in France.

References 

Prehistoric turtle genera
Eocene turtles
Fossils of Africa
Bothremydidae
Eocene life
Eocene Africa
Fossil taxa described in 2003